Borough 9 is a southern borough of Düsseldorf, the state capital of North Rhine-Westphalia, Germany. The borough covers an area of 36.57 square kilometres and (as of December 2020) has approximately 94,000 inhabitants, making it the city's second most populous borough after Borough 3.

The borough borders Düsseldorf Boroughs 3 and 8 to the north, and 10 to the south. To the east and west the borough borders the rural districts of Mettmann and Rhein-Kreis Neuss respectively.

Subdivisions 
Borough 9 is made up of eight Stadtteile (city parts):

Places of interest

Arts, Culture and Entertainment

Landmarks 
 Park and Schloss Benrath, Benrath, Park and Castle
 St. Hubertus, Itter,  romanesque church from 12th century
 St. Nikolaus, Himmelgeist, romanesque church from 11th century

Parks and open spaces 
 Benrather Wald
 Botanic Garden of Düsseldorf University
 Freizeitpark Niederheid
 Hasseler Forst
 Himmelgeister Rheinbogen
 Park Elbroich
 Schlosspark Benrath
 Südpark
 Urdenbacher Kämpe

Transportation 
The borough is served by numerous railway stations and highway. Stations include Düsseldorf-Benrath, Düsseldorf-Reisholz and both Düsseldorf Stadtbahn light rail- and Rheinbahn tram-stations. The borough can also be reached via Bundesautobahn 46 and 59 as well as Bundesstraße 8 and 228.

See also 
 Boroughs of Düsseldorf

References

External links 
 Official webpage of the borough 

!